Xikuangshan mine in Lengshuijiang, Hunan, China, contains the world's largest deposit of antimony. It is unique in that there is a large deposit of stibnite (Sb2S3) in a layer of Devonian limestone. There are three mineral beds which are between 2.5 and 8 m thick which are folded in an anticline that plunges to the south-west. The total mineralised area of the mine has a surface extent of 14 km2. There are two different units at the mine, the northern one produces mixed oxide and sulfide such as stibiconite (Sb3O6(OH)) and the southern one produces stibnite. Ore is concentrated and refined on site in a refinery with a capacity of 10,000 tonnes of antimony per year.

History
The mine is thought to have been discovered in 1521 and was originally mined for its tin deposits. 464,000 tonnes of antimony were produced at the mine between 1892 and 1929. From 1949 to 1981, 172,000 tonnes of antimony were produced. In 1981 1,700 tonnes of ore was being mined each day which was between 2 and 3 percent pure antimony.

Reserves
In 1981, reserves at the Xikuangshan deposit amounted to 10,000,000 tonnes of ore that contained 2 to 3 percent antimony (200-300,000 tonnes of antimony), at the time geologists thought that there may be more in the area. By 2002 the estimated size of the deposit was 2,110,000 tonnes of pure antimony. The ore is composed of quartz, calcite, stibnite and some pyrite.

Formation
Using samarium–neodymium dating, it has been estimated that the deposit formed during the late Jurassic – early Cretaceous period (around 145 million years ago).

Water Pollution
In April 2010 it was reported that antimony levels in water near the mine were as high as 11 parts per million, a thousand times those found in uncontaminated water.  The antimony was found to be in the V oxidation state, believed to be the least dangerous aqueous form (antimony can have a I, III or V oxidation state).  The environmental effects of this high level of the rare metal are poorly understood and are currently under investigation by a team from the Chinese Academy of Sciences, Indiana University Bloomington and the University of Alberta.

References

External links
Photograph of a ~1 m stibnite crystal from Xikuangshan mine (dead link 24 March 2019)
Report of high antimony V in water near the mine
Mine location Google Maps

Antimony mines
Lengshuijiang
Mines in China